Bungee Jumping of Their Own is a 2001 South Korean film starring Lee Byung-hun and Lee Eun-ju. The film had 947,000 admissions, making it the 10th most attended film of the year.

Plot 
Seo In-woo (Lee Byung-hun) unexpectedly falls in love with In Tae-hee (Lee Eun-ju), a fellow student at the same university, when she asks to share his umbrella in a rainstorm. It is love at first sight for In-woo, and they start dating after only a couple of weeks. Tae-hee dies suddenly when she is hit by a car.

17 years later, In-woo is a high school teacher, married with a child. He starts to notice similarities between a new student of his, Hyun-bin, and Tae-hee. In-woo struggles with the concept of falling in love with another man, and they get bullied by students at the school for appearing to be homosexual.

They overcome their fears with the realization that Hyun-bin is Tae-hee reincarnated, and they are eternal soulmates. The movie ends with a shot of them in New Zealand jumping off a bridge hand in hand. It is unclear whether they are bungee jumping or mean to end their lives together and be reincarnated again.

Cast

Awards
2001 Baeksang Arts Awards 
 Best Screenplay: Go Eun-nim
 Best New Actor: Yeo Hyun-soo

2001 Grand Bell Awards
 Best Screenplay: Go Eun-nim

2001 Blue Dragon Film Awards
 Best Screenplay: Go Eun-nim
 Best New Director: Kim Dae-seung

Film festivals
It was selected to appear in the 2002 Frameline Film Festival and the 2004 Korean Film Festival DC.

Adaptation
A stage musical entitled Bungee Jump was produced in 2012, with lyrics by Hue Park and music by American composer Will Aronson. The production was successful and won the award for best score at the 7th Musical Awards and the 18th Korea Musical Awards.

It has been remake in Thai film titled Dew in 2019 by Chookiat Sakveerakul, lead role by Sukollawat Kanarot.

On November 2, 2021, it was announced that Jeong Yun o and Lee Hyun-wook will appear in the OTT drama remake of the movie and will take the role of Im Hyun-bin and Seo In woo. On December 9, it was announced that the remake was cancelled due to concerns from the original screenwriter. The original screen writer opposed the remake due to his newly found christian beliefs, which are against the theme of homosexuality, suicide and rebirth which is a main plot point in the film.

References

External links 
 
 
 

2001 romantic drama films
2001 films
2000s Korean-language films
South Korean LGBT-related films
Films about educators
Films about reincarnation
Films about suicide
Films directed by Kim Dae-seung
Films set in 1983
Films set in 2000
Films set in New Zealand
Films set in South Korea
Films shot in New Zealand
Bisexuality-related films
South Korean romantic drama films
2001 directorial debut films
2000s South Korean films